Hanley Castle is a village and civil parish in Worcestershire, England, between the towns of Malvern and Upton upon Severn and a short distance from the River Severn. It lies in the administrative area of Malvern Hills District, and is part of the informal region known as The Malverns.  It is served primarily by bus service 332 Worcester - Upton upon Severn - Hanley Castle operated by Aston Coaches and 363 Worcester - Tewkesbury operated by First Worcester.

The village population together with that of the nearby village of Hanley Swan is around 1500. The central feature of the village is the cul-de-sac of Church End with its village green dominated by a huge Cedar of Lebanon tree that is reputed to be approximately 900 years old, the unspoiled 15th-century red-brick and timbered pub, other listed buildings, and the campus of Hanley Castle High School.

History

In the 12th century the heavily forested area became the seat of administration of the Malvern Chase, a royal hunting area. There was once a Norman castle built as a hunting lodge for King John in 1207 near the present day village. By the end of the 15th century it had been mostly demolished, and the tower was finally removed in 1795. However, a few traces still remain including a dry moat and a mound.

Hanley Castle Grammar School was founded in 1326.

During the Worcester Campaign of the Third English Civil War, a Royalist brigade under Major General Edward Massey, were quartered in Upton-upon-Severn to defend the partially demolished bridge. Massey with about 150 of his soldiers stayed in Severn End with the owner Nicolas Lechmere. On 29 August 1651 Massey was wounded in the head and the thigh during the fighting in Upton after the Parliamentarian soldiers under the command of Colonel John Lambert had forced a passage across the bridge as they advanced on Worcester.

Poor laws resulted in over 110 individuals being removed from Hanley Castle between 1717 and 1835, while a similar number were returned. This often involved the return of pregnant women. In 1830, for example, a woman was returned from Bristol after falling pregnant by a shoemaker who was married.

Hanley Castle High School

The Grammar school, now a comprehensive school with a roll of about 1,000 pupils is located in the centre of Hanley Castle next to the village green. For much of the 20th century the grammar school was a day and boarding school with a staff of about 15 and around 200 boys aged 11 to 18 who were admitted by selection only after passing the eleven-plus exam. Although government owned, it was run very much on the traditional lines of a typical English 'Public School'. In 1969 following changes in government education policy, the school developed more in the style of a comprehensive school with a focus on both academic and vocational education.  The school serves not only Hanley Castle village itself, but also the nearby town of Upton upon Severn, and other local villages including Hanley Swan, Welland and Castlemorton and is one of three state secondary schools for Malvern children. In 2009 the school received an exceptionally good OFSTED report.

Severn End
Severn End is a large Elizabethan and Jacobean mansion at the seat of the Lechmere baronets in Hanley Castle since the 11th century. The Grade II listed building is situated on the banks of the River Severn, and is reached from a large gatehouse by a long private road through the estate.

The Three Kings inn
Records from the 17th century of the village inn at Church End show the property as owned by the three King brothers who sold it to the Lechmere family in 1710. The inn has been run by its tenants, the Roberts family, since 1911. In 1993, the inn received the first prize of CAMRA National Pub of the Year award, and was runner up for the prize in 1998.

Literature
In the 1880s W.S. Symonds wrote a historical romance called Hanley Castle, which was set during the English Civil War (mid-17th century):

Between 1915 and his death in 1975, P.G. Wodehouse based several stories in the area. Severn End, the stately home of the Lechmere family, may have been the inspiration for Brinkley Court, the country seat for Bertie Wooster's Aunt Dahlia. In addition, the then Hanley Castle Grammar School was the model for Market Snodsbury Grammar School, with at least one of the stories mentioning the School Hall, now the School Library, in detail.

Notes

References

 

 (out of copyright – full text available)

Further reading

External links

 Historical information at Vision of Britain
 More history at British History Online
 Hanley Castle and Hanley Swan website
 Parish Council
 Hanley Castle – the novel
 Benefice of Hanley Castle with Hanley Swan and Welland
 Old photos of HC
 Hanley Swan literary history

Villages in Worcestershire
Civil parishes in Worcestershire
Historical novels